Carl Lustig Prean (born 20 August 1967 in Ryde, Isle of Wight) is a former international table tennis player. He competed at the three Olympic Games.

Table tennis career
He is former England senior no.1 table tennis player, a feat he first achieved when he was only 15. He is a three time English Men's Champion and won the European Youth Championships (Under 17 age group) in 1985 and (Under 14) in 1982. He is a winner of both the prestigious Belgian and Brazilian Opens, and represented Great Britain at three Olympics (Seoul, Barcelona and Atlanta).

At the Barcelona Olympics in 1992, Prean progressed from his group in first place following victories against Baboor (India), Casares (ESP) and Choi (PRK).  In the last 16, Prean faced eventual winner Jan-Ove Waldner losing out 3 sets to nil.

Prean was known for his unorthodox style using combination bats and his strong forehand topspin.

He spent the majority of his career playing professionally in the German Bundesliga.

See also
 List of England players at the World Team Table Tennis Championships
 List of World Table Tennis Championships medalists

References

External links
 Carl Prean on the British Olympic Association website

1967 births
Living people
Olympic table tennis players of Great Britain
Table tennis players at the 1988 Summer Olympics
Table tennis players at the 1992 Summer Olympics
Table tennis players at the 1996 Summer Olympics
People from Ryde
English male table tennis players